Edward Cox (born 25 July 1985) is a British sprint canoeist who has competed since the late 2000s. He won a silver medal in the K-1  event at the 2010 ICF Canoe Sprint World Championships in Poznań.

References
British Canoe Union story on the 2010 ICF Canoe Sprint World Championships. – accessed 22 August 2010.
Canoe'09.ca profile.

1985 births
British male canoeists
Living people
ICF Canoe Sprint World Championships medalists in kayak
Place of birth missing (living people)